The Federal Air Transport Agency ( - Federalnoye agentstvo vozdushnogo transporta, FAVT), also known as Rosaviatsiya, or FATA, is the Russian government agency responsible for overseeing the civil aviation industry in Russia. Its headquarters are in Moscow.

It is also called the Russian Federation Civil Aviation Administration (RFCAA).

The Federal Air Transport Agency regularly works alongside the Interstate Aviation Committee in investigations of aviation accidents and incidents. Its U.S. equivalent is the Federal Aviation Administration.

History 
The Federal Air Transport Agency was established in 2004 by Russian President Vladimir Putin. On March 9, 2004, Putin issued a decree, “On the System and Structure of Federal Executive Bodies,” in which the Agency was created. The Agency received many of the functions of the abolished Ministry of Transport of the Russian Federation.

A cyberattack on Rosaviatsia by hackers was unleashed in late March 2022 following the Russian invasion of Ukraine. The effect was massive disruption and the Russian agency released information that it had switched back to paper records:  Due to temporary lack of access to Internet and malfunction of the electronic document flow system of Rosaviatsia the Federal Agency for Air Transport is switching to paper version. The document flow procedure is being determined by the current records management instructions. Information exchange will be carried out via AFTN channel (for urgent short message) and postal mail. Please make this information available to all Civil Aviation Organizations.
Due to budget limitations, Rosaviatsia did not have good backup of the hacked data.

Leadership 
The head of the Federal Air Transport Agency is appointed and dismissed by the government of the Russian Federation. At its creation, the head was Nikolay Vladimirovich Shipil. Other heads followed, and since 2009,  has headed the Agency.

Functions 
The main functions of the Federal Air Transport Agency are:

 organization of the execution of federal target programs and the federal target investment program;
 provision of public services of public importance on conditions established by federal legislation to an indefinite number of persons, including for the purposes of: implementing a package of measures to organize the enforcement of international and domestic flights; implementation of a set of measures aimed at ensuring the security of transport infrastructure facilities and vehicles against acts of unlawful interference;
 publication of individual legal acts on the basis of and pursuant to the Constitution of the Russian Federation, federal constitutional laws, federal laws, acts and instructions of the President of the Russian Federation, the Government of the Russian Federation and the Ministry of Transport of the Russian Federation;
 governing the Unified Air Traffic Management System of the Russian Federation.

References

External links 

  Federal Air Transport Agency 

Civil aviation in Russia
Russia
Russia
Government agencies of Russia
Transport organizations based in Russia